Syriac Orthodox Archdiocese of Baghdad is an archdiocese of the Syriac Orthodox Church, centered in Baghdad, capital city of Iraq. The diocese originated during the early medieval period. It is attested between the 9th and the 13th centuries, but later declined, to be renewed again, thus existing up to the modern times. The diocese was probably established soon after Baghdad became the capital of the Abbasid Caliphate in the 770s. Eight Syriac Orthodox bishops of Baghdad from the medieval period are mentioned in the narratives of Michael the Syrian, Bar Hebraeus and other sources. Current Archbishop (since 1980) is Severius Jamil Hawa (b. 1931).

Sources 

The main primary sources for the Syriac Orthodox bishops of Baghdad are the Chronicle of the Syriac Orthodox patriarch Michael the Syrian (1166–1199), who was one of the most notable Syriac Orthodox writers of the medieval period, and also the Chronicon Ecclesiasticum of the thirteenth-century Jacobite polymath Bar Hebraeus.

Bishops of Baghdad 
Eight Jacobite bishops of Baghdad are attested between the ninth and thirteenth centuries.

The bishop Laʿzar bar Sabtha of Baghdad was deposed by the patriarch Dionysius of Tel Mahre (818–45) in 826.

The bishop Yohannan of Baghdad was consecrated by the patriarch Dionysius of Tel Mahre (818–45) in October or November 829 to replace the deposed bishop Laʿzar bar Sabtha.

The diocese of Baghdad seems to have lapsed around the end of the thirteenth century, but was later renewed.

20th Century
The Syriac Orthodox Church in Baghdad was re-established in 1962 as archbishopric for the church of Baghdad and Basra' Here's a list of the archbishops since that date
 Gregorios Boulus Behnam (1962-1969)
 Mor Severios Zakka (1969-1980). (Later, Ignatius Zakka I, Syriac Orthodox Patriarch of Antioch and All the East)
 Severios Jamil Hawa (1980-Present)

See also 
 Dioceses of the Syriac Orthodox Church
 Oriental Orthodoxy in Iraq
 Syriac Orthodox Church

References

Sources 

 
 Jean-Baptiste Chabot, Chronique de Michel le Syrien, Patriarche Jacobite d'Antioche (1166-1199). Éditée pour la première fois et traduite en francais I-IV (1899;1901;1905;1910; a supplement to volume I containing an introduction to Michael and his work, corrections, and an index, was published in 1924. Reprinted in four volumes 1963, 2010).
 
 
 

Syriac Orthodox dioceses
Oriental Orthodoxy in Iraq
Christianity in Baghdad
Baghdad under the Abbasid Caliphate